The  is a railway line in Kyushu, Japan, operated by Kyushu Railway Company (JR Kyushu). It connects Tayoshi Station in Miyazaki, Miyazaki with Miyazaki Airport Station. Trains continue to and from Minami-Miyazaki Station and Miyazaki Station in the city center and further on the Nippō Main Line.

History
The  line opened on 18 July 1996, 30 years after jet services to the airport commenced.

Stations

References

Lines of Kyushu Railway Company
Airport rail links in Japan
1067 mm gauge railways in Japan
Railway lines opened in 1996
1996 establishments in Japan
Rail transport in Miyazaki Prefecture